Dolby Cinema is a premium cinema created by Dolby Laboratories that combines Dolby proprietary technologies such as Dolby Vision and Dolby Atmos, as well as other signature entrance and intrinsic design features. The technology competes with IMAX and other premium large formats such as Cinemark's XD and Regal's RPX.

History 
The first installations featuring Dolby Cinema were JT (now Vue) Bioscopen Cinema in Eindhoven, Netherlands on 18 December 2014; followed by Cinesa La Maquinista in Barcelona, Spain. Dolby Laboratories has partner contracts with Cinesa, Vue Cinemas, AMC Theatres (known as Dolby Cinema at AMC, formerly Dolby Cinema at AMC Prime until early 2017), Cineplexx Cinemas, Wanda Cinemas, Jackie Chan Cinema, Reel Cinemas and Odeon Cinemas to install Dolby Cinemas.

On May 26, 2017, Dolby announced they made a deal with Les Cinémas Gaumont Pathé to open 10 new locations in Europe. Seven will be located in France and three will be located in The Netherlands.

Technology

Dolby Vision 
Dolby Cinema utilizes a Dolby Vision projection system developed by Dolby Laboratories in conjunction with Christie Digital. The system consists of dual Christie 4K 6P (primary) modular laser projectors featuring a custom design to allow for unique light path. The system is capable of delivering up to 14 foot-lambert (48 nits) on unity-gain matte-white screens for 3-D (and up to 31 foot-lambert (106 nits) for 2-D), a substantial improvement on current generation 3-D systems which deliver in the range of 3 to 4 foot-lambert for 3-D. The result is improved brightness, color and contrast compared to traditional xenon projectors. The first theaters temporarily used off-the-shelf dual Christie 4K laser projectors until the Dolby Vision-capable ones were shipped out in spring 2015.

Dolby 3D uses spectrum separation, where the two projectors function in stacked operation with each projector emitting a slightly different wavelength of red, green, and blue primary. There is no polarization present on the projector, and the 3-D spectacles have notch filters that block the primaries used by the projector projecting the image intended for the other eye.

Dolby Vision is able to display the following combinations of resolution and frame-rate:
 2K – 2D at 120fps, 60fps, 48fps and 30fps
 2K – 3D at 120fps, 60fps, 48fps and 30fps per eye / projector
 4K – 2D at 120fps, 60fps, 48fps and 30fps
 4K – 3D at 120fps, 60fps, 48fps and 30fps per eye / projector
 8K – 2D at 120fps, 60fps, 48fps and 30fps
 8K – 3D at 120fps, 60fps, 48fps and 30fps per eye / projector

Although the twin projectors are capable of displaying the 7,500:1 contrast ratio defined by the DCI fixed luminance gamma function, for movies not graded with Dolby Vision, the projectors are limited to 5,000:1 contrast ratio. The Hollywood studios have graded over 100 films directly on Dolby Cinema projectors, the creative team can then create content with contrast ratios of 1,000,000:1.

Dolby Atmos 

Another component of the Dolby Cinema experience is Dolby Atmos, an object-oriented, 3-D immersive surround-sound format developed by Dolby Laboratories. The system is capable of 128 simultaneous audio inputs utilizing up to 64 individual speakers to enhance viewer immersion. The first film to support the new format was Disney and Pixar's animated film Brave, released in 2012.

Signature entrance 
Most Dolby Cinemas feature a curved video wall entrance displaying content related to the feature film playing in the auditorium. The content displayed on the video wall is specifically generated by the film studio and is intended to immerse viewers in the movie experience before the movie has started. The video is generated using multiple short throw high definition projectors in the entrance ceiling and proprietary software is used to pixel map the different images together along the wall. Similarly, the audio is generated using speakers placed in the ceiling of the entrance.

See also
 IMAX
 RealD 3D

References

External links
 Dolby Cinema Homepage
 Dolby Cinema Locations
 Theatrical Releases in Dolby Vision and Dolby Atmos

Dolby Laboratories
High dynamic range
Premium large format movie formats
Surround sound